Jesús Martínez Díez (born 7 June 1952) is a Mexican former football defender who played for Mexico in the 1978 FIFA World Cup. He also played for Club América.

References

External links
FIFA profile
 

1952 births
Mexican footballers
Mexico international footballers
Association football defenders
Club América footballers
1978 FIFA World Cup players
Living people